Ferdowsieh (also Romanized as Ferdowsīeh; formerly, Ferdows) is a city in the Central District of Shahriar County, Tehran province, Iran. At the 2006 census, its population was 20,854 in 5,435 households. The following census in 2011 counted 24,508 people in 6,940 households. The latest census in 2016 showed a population of 34,221 people in 10,290 households.

References 

Shahriar County

Cities in Tehran Province

Populated places in Tehran Province

Populated places in Shahriar County